Richards Mansion, also known as The Mansion House, is a historic mansion located at Georgetown, Sussex County, Delaware.  The oldest section was built between 1796 and 1799, and is a two-story, four bay, single pile Federal style structure that is now the rear wing.  The main house was built between 1835 and 1845, and is a three-story, five bay, frame structure in the Greek Revival style.  The third floor was added in 1883, with the addition of a mansard roof in the Second Empire style.

The site was added to the National Register of Historic Places in 1979.

References

Houses on the National Register of Historic Places in Delaware
Second Empire architecture in Delaware
Federal architecture in Delaware
Greek Revival houses in Delaware
Houses completed in 1883
Houses in Georgetown, Delaware
National Register of Historic Places in Sussex County, Delaware